The Katonah–Lewisboro Union Free School District, or simply the Katonah–Lewisboro School District (KLSD) is a school district headquartered in South Salem, New York. The district has a Katonah, New York mailing address.

History

Paul Kreutzer was previously superintendent until he resigned unexpectedly in 2014.

Headquarters
The headquarters is located in the 1 Shady Lane building in South Salem. In August 2011 the headquarters moved from 1 Shady Lane to Increase Miller Elementary School in Goldens Bridge. In 2014 the district redistricted its elementary schools so it moved the headquarters back to South Salem. On March 26 of that year the district relocated the Human Resources Department. On March 31 the district moved its Business Office. On April 7 it moved its Superintendents Office.

Schools
 John Jay High School (Cross River)
 John Jay Middle School (Cross River)
Elementary schools:
 Increase Miller Elementary School (Goldens Bridge)
 Katonah Elementary School (Katonah)
 Meadow Pond Elementary School (South Salem)

Closed schools
 Lewisboro Elementary School (South Salem, closed 2014)

References

External links
 
 District board documents

School districts in New York (state)
Education in Westchester County, New York